Alan Mowbray (born Alfred Ernest Allen; 18 August 1896 – 25 March 1969) was an English stage and film actor who found success in Hollywood.

Early life
Mowbray was born in London, England.  He served with distinction in the British Army in World War I, being awarded the Military Medal and the French Croix de Guerre for bravery in action. He applied for transfer to the Royal Air Force, which was granted just six days before the war ended. This placed him in London on Armistice Day. His service came to an end when the Royal Air Force wanted another seven years from him.

Career
Mowbray began his stage career in London in 1922, as an actor and stage manager. In 1923 he arrived in the United States and was soon acting with New York stock companies. He debuted on Broadway in The Sport of Kings (1926); in 1929 he wrote, directed and starred in the unsuccessful Dinner Is Served.

Mowbray made his film debut in God's Gift to Women (1931) playing a butler, a role in which he was thereafter often cast. Famed ‘30s novelist and screenwriter Raymond Chandler lampooned Mowbray's distinctive clipped speech in these roles in his pulp magazine story Mandarin's Jade (1937):

Mowbray appeared in five more pictures in 1931, notably portraying George Washington in Alexander Hamilton. In 1935, he played one of the male leads in Becky Sharp, the first feature-length film in full-colour Technicolor, as well as playing the lead in the farcical Night Life of the Gods, based on a Thorne Smith novel. It was for another Thorne Smith–derived film, Topper (1937), that Mowbray may be best remembered; he played Topper's butler Wilkins, a role he reprised the following year in Topper Takes a Trip. Throughout the 1930s and 1940s, Mowbray worked steadily, appearing in over 120 films.

In the 1950s, Mowbray's film roles decreased, and he began to appear on television. He played the title role in the DuMont TV series Colonel Humphrey Flack, which first aired in 1953–54 and was revived in 1958–59. In the 1954–55 television season, Mowbray played Mr. Swift, the drama coach of the character Mickey Mulligan, in NBC's short-lived The Mickey Rooney Show: Hey, Mulligan. He portrayed the character Stewart Styles, a maitre d with a checkered past in the 1960-1961 adventure/drama series Dante, reprising a role he had originally played in several episodes of Four Star Theatre. Mowbray appeared in the titular role as a crooked astrologer in the 1959 episode "The Misfortune Teller" of the Maverick television series starring James Garner and Kathleen Crowley, and as Cranshaw in the episode "Quite a Woman" of the 1961 series The Investigators starring James Franciscus.

In 1956, Mowbray appeared in three major films, The King and I, The Man Who Knew Too Much and Around the World in 80 Days. His final film role was as Captain Norcross in A Majority of One in 1961. In 1963, he returned to Broadway in the successful comedy Enter Laughing, playing Marlowe, the unscrupulous mentor to David Kolowitz (played by Alan Arkin).

Mowbray was a founding member of the Screen Actors Guild in 1933, writing a personal check to fund the group's incorporation and serving as the first vice president.

Personal life
Mowbray married Lorraine Carpenter in 1927. Together they had two children, including daughter Patricia, who, at age 28 married her father's friend, 70-year-old actor Douglass Dumbrille, in 1960.

Mowbray was among the founders of the Hollywood Cricket Club. He was a prominent early member of the Masquers Club, and donated the group's long-time clubhouse  in Hollywood.

Mowbray died of a heart attack in 1969 in Hollywood, survived by his wife and children. His body is interred in the Holy Cross Cemetery in Culver City, California.

Filmography

TV appearances
The Patty Duke Show, as director of the high school play in which both Patty and Cathy appeared
Four Star Playhouse in Dick Powell's episode "The House Always Wins" (1955)
Whispering Smith, in "Poet and Peasant Case" episode (1960)
Maverick with James Garner and Kathleen Crowley, in "The Misfortune Teller" episode as Luke Abigor (1960)
The Investigators with James Franciscus and James Philbrook, in the episode "Quite a Woman" as Cranshaw (1961)

References

External links

 
 
 
 
 The Adventures of Colonel Flack
 "Up From Central Park: Scenes From an Actor's Life", book review of Mowbray's memoirs at Immortal Ephemera, including excerpts; accessed 6 November 2015.

1896 births
1969 deaths
20th-century English male actors
British Army personnel of World War I
British expatriate male actors in the United States
Burials at Holy Cross Cemetery, Culver City
English male film actors
English male stage actors
English male television actors
King's Own Yorkshire Light Infantry soldiers
Male actors from London
People educated at London Oratory School
Recipients of the Military Medal
Royal Air Force personnel of World War I
Recipients of the Croix de Guerre 1914–1918 (France)